Aurora Municipal Airport , also known as Al Potter Field, is a public airport located two miles (3 km) north of the central business district of Aurora, a city in Hamilton County, Nebraska, United States. It is owned by Aurora Airport Authority.

Although most U.S. airports use the same three-letter location identifier for the FAA and IATA, Aurora Municipal Airport is assigned AUH by the FAA but has no designation from the IATA (which assigned AUH to Abu Dhabi International Airport in the United Arab Emirates).

Facilities 
For the 12-month period ending July 16, 2009, the airport had 15,925 aircraft operations, an average of 43 per day: 99% general aviation and 1% military. There are 25 aircraft based at this airport: 88% single engine, 12% ultralights.

References

External links 
 Aurora Municipal Airport at City of Aurora website

Airports in Nebraska
Buildings and structures in Hamilton County, Nebraska